William Henry Stone (8 October 1834 – 7 November 1896) was an English Liberal politician who sat in the House of Commons from 1865 to 1874.

Stone was the son of William Stone of Dulwich Hill and his wife Mary Platt daughter of Thomas Platt of Hampstead.  He was educated at Harrow School and at Trinity College, Cambridge graduating BA as 30th Wrangler and 8th Classic in 1857 and MA in 1860. In 1859, he was a Fellow of Trinity College. He was a merchant and East India agent and a director of the London and County Banking Co. He lived at Godalming and was a J.P. for Surrey and Hampshire.
 
At the 1865 general election Stone was elected as a Member of Parliament (MP) for Portsmouth. He was re-elected in 1868 held the seat until his defeat at the 1874 general election.

He was chairman of the Girl's Public Day School Company and gave evidence to the Royal Commission on Secondary Education in 1894, with Mary Gurney.

Stone died at the age of 62.

Stone married Melicent Helps daughter of Sir Arthur Helps in 1864.

References

External links

1834 births
1896 deaths
Liberal Party (UK) MPs for English constituencies
UK MPs 1865–1868
UK MPs 1868–1874
People educated at Harrow School
Alumni of Trinity College, Cambridge
Fellows of Trinity College, Cambridge
People from Godalming